Vice-Admiral Sir David Worthington Brown   (28 November 1927 – 13 July 2005) was a Royal Navy officer who served as Flag Officer, Plymouth.

Naval career
Educated in HMS Conway, Brown joined the Royal Navy in June 1945. After commanding four minesweepers, he took over the destroyer HMS Cavendish, then successively the frigates HMS Falmouth and HMS Hermione and finally the destroyer HMS Bristol. He became He was appointed Director of Naval Operations and Trade under the Ministry of Defence Naval Staff in 1972, Director of Officer Appointments (Executive) in 1976 and Assistant Chief of the Defence Staff (Operations) in 1980. In this capacity he was responsible for briefing senior naval officers and Prime Minister Margaret Thatcher on the planning for the Falklands War. He went on to be Flag Officer, Plymouth and Admiral Superintendent at Devonport in 1982 before retiring in 1985.

In retirement he became a consultant to the insurance brokers, Hogg Group and Chairman of the Governors of Broadmoor Hospital.

Family
In 1958 he married Etienne Hester Boileau; they had three daughters.

References

1927 births
2005 deaths
Royal Navy vice admirals
Knights Commander of the Order of the Bath
People educated aboard HMS Conway
Royal Navy personnel of the Falklands War